See You, See Ya, or Seeya may refer to

 See You (film), a 1995 Croatian television film 
 SeeYa, a South Korean girl band
 See You (album), by Josh Wilson, 2011
 "See You" (Depeche Mode song), 1982
 "See You...", a 2006 single by melody
 "Seeya" (Deadmau5 song), 2014
 "See Ya" (Atomic Kitten song), 2000

See also

I See You (disambiguation)
See You Later (disambiguation)
CYA (disambiguation)
"See Ya Bill", a song